Kalynn Park (born September 12, 1988) is a Canadian curler and curling coach. She is right-handed.

She and Charley Thomas won the 2015 Canadian Mixed Doubles Curling Trials and represented Canada at the 2015 World Mixed Doubles Curling Championship.

Achievements
 Canadian Mixed Doubles Curling Championship: gold (2015), silver (2014).
 Canadian Junior Curling Championships: bronze (2009).

Teams and events

Women's

Mixed

Mixed doubles

Coaching (national teams)

Personal life
Park is a graduate of the University of Alberta and Athabasca University. She works as a Paralegal for Law Fifty One. She is the daughter of curler Kevin Park and was married to Brock Virtue.

References

External links

Curling World Cup profile
Linkedin profile

1988 births
Living people
Canadian women curlers
Canadian mixed doubles curling champions
Curlers from Edmonton
Canadian curling coaches
University of Alberta alumni
Athabasca University alumni